Andreas Munkert (7 March 1908 – 23 April 1982) was a German international footballer. He was part of Germany's squad at the 1936 Summer Olympics, but he did not play in any matches.

References

1908 births
1982 deaths
Association football defenders
German footballers
Germany international footballers
1. FC Nürnberg players
SC Freiburg managers
German football managers